Komei Shimbun (公明新聞; Clean Government Newspaper) is a Japanese language daily newspaper which is the official organ of Komeito, a conservative political party in Japan. The paper has been in circulation since 1962.

History and profile
Komei Shimbun was started by the Komeito party, and the first issue appeared on 2 April 1962. The same year party also launched a monthly political magazine, Komei (Japanese: Clean Government). The income of the party was partly generated through the sale of these publications in the late 1960s. The headquarters of Komei Shimbun is in Tokyo.

References

External links

1962 establishments in Japan
Daily newspapers published in Japan
Japanese-language newspapers
Newspapers published in Tokyo
Publications established in 1962
Conservative media in Japan